Bruce Manson (born March 20, 1956) is an American former professional tennis player. He achieved a career-high doubles ranking of world No. 17 in 1981. His career high singles ranking was World No. 39, but he did, when ranked 112, defeat world number 1 Björn Borg in 1979 at the Tennis Games Tournament at Mission Hills Country Club.

Biography
Manson is Jewish, and was born in Los Angeles, California, and lived in North Hollywood.  He attended Grant High School. He was the first player to win three consecutive L.A. City Tennis Singles Championships (1973–75). He won the boys 16 and under in the Ojai Tennis Tournament in 1972.  He was the Southern California Junior Singles Champion in both 1973 and 1974, and was a member of the U.S. Junior Davis Cup Team.

At the University of Southern California on a tennis scholarship, Manson was a three-time All-American (1975–77). He was an NCAA Singles semi-finalist in both 1976 and 1977, and doubles champion in 1975 and 1977. While at USC, Manson won a gold medal in doubles at the 1975 Pan American Games. In 1977, he won the 21-and-under U.S. Singles title.

Manson enjoyed most of his tennis success while playing doubles.  During his career he won 9 doubles titles and finished runner-up an additional 8 times.  He achieved a career-high doubles ranking of World No. 17 in 1981. His career high singles ranking was World No. 39. He was a member of the 1980 U.S. Davis Cup Team, and made the U.S. Open quarter-finals in 1981 by defeating Danny Saltz, Richard Meyer, Peter McNamara and José Luis Clerc, before being defeated by Vitas Gerulaitis.

In 1993 he was inducted into the Southern California Jewish Sports Hall of Fame.

After retiring from tennis in 1985, he earned an MBA from the Wharton School of the University of Pennsylvania in 1987, and began a career as a bond trader with First Boston in 1987 in New York. He moved to London in 1988, working for CSFB and later Barclays Bank, returned to New York in 1993 with Barclays, and  moved to HSBC Bank in 2004.

Career finals

Doubles (9 titles, 8 runner-ups)

See also
List of select Jewish tennis players

References

External links
 
 

1956 births
Living people
21st-century American Jews
American expatriates in the United Kingdom
American male tennis players
American bankers

Tennis players from Los Angeles
Sportspeople from New York City
Jewish American sportspeople
Jewish tennis players
Tennis people from New York (state)
Tennis players at the 1975 Pan American Games
USC Trojans men's tennis players
Wharton School of the University of Pennsylvania alumni
Pan American Games medalists in tennis
Pan American Games gold medalists for the United States
Grant High School (Los Angeles) alumni
Medalists at the 1975 Pan American Games